Aliasger K. Salem is the Associate Vice President for Research at the University of Iowa and Bighley Chair and Professor of Pharmaceutical Sciences at the University of Iowa College of Pharmacy. Salem's academic appointment at the University of Iowa is based in the College of Pharmacy, with additional secondary appointments in the College of Dentistry, Department of Chemical and Biochemical Engineering, Department of Biomedical Engineering, Department of Chemistry, and the Holden Comprehensive Cancer Center. Prior to joining the University of Iowa in 2004, he was a postdoctoral fellow at the Johns Hopkins School of Medicine and completed his PhD at the School of Pharmacy and Pharmaceutical Sciences at the University of Nottingham in the UK.

Salem was an American Cancer Society Research Scholar from 2009 to 2013. Salem is currently the leader of the Experimental Therapeutics (ET) program at the Holden Comprehensive Cancer Center and co-director of the Nanotoxicology Core at the Environmental Health Sciences Research Center. Aliasger Salem is the associate editor for The AAPS Journal - The official journal of the American Association for Pharmaceutical Scientists (Springer-Nature) and an editorial board member for a number of other journals including the International Journal of Pharmaceutics (Elsevier). Aliasger Salem has been or is a member of a number of grant review study sections including panels for the American Cancer Society, the National Institutes of Health, the National Science Foundation, and the Department of Defense (DoD): Congressionally Directed Medical Research Programs (CDMRP) Prostate and Breast Cancer Research Programs.

Salem has received a number of teaching awards including a Council of Teaching Instructional Improvement Award in 2008 and a Collegiate Teacher of the Year award in 2012. He serves as a faculty adviser in the National Organization for the Professional Advancement of Black Chemists and Chemical Engineers. 

Salem's research interests  include nanotechnology, microfabrication, particle and drug delivery systems, implantable chips, the design of gene delivery systems, regenerative medicine, and the development of vaccines.

Selected honors and awards
2021 Elected Fellow, American Association for the Advancement of Science
2020 Hancher-Finkbine Medallion
2020 Leadership in Research Award, Office of the Vice President for Research, University of Iowa
2018 Elected Fellow, American Institute for Medical and Biological Engineering
2017 Elected Fellow, American Association for Pharmaceutical Scientists
2017 Lyle and Sharon Bighley Chair and Professor of Pharmaceutical Sciences
2014 Associate editor, The AAPS Journal - The Official Journal of the American Association for Pharmaceutical Scientists (Springer-Nature)
2013 Lyle and Sharon Bighley Endowed Professor of Pharmaceutical Sciences
2009 American Cancer Society Research Scholar Award
2005 The Pharmaceutical Research and Manufacturers of America Foundation Award

References

External links
Salem Group Page
College of Pharmacy Faculty Profile
University of Iowa College of Pharmacy

Living people
American nanotechnologists
Pharmaceutical scientists
University of Iowa
University of Iowa faculty
Year of birth missing (living people)
American chemists
21st-century American chemists
21st-century American scientists
Fellows of the American Institute for Medical and Biological Engineering
Fellows of the American Association for the Advancement of Science